Dar Zuzovsky (born ) is an Israeli actress and model. As an actress she had appeared in Hostages and Beauty and the Baker.

Early life
Zuzovsky was born in Tel Aviv, Israel, to Israeli-born parents of Ashkenazi Jewish (Polish-Jewish and Czechoslovak-Jewish) descent. In Hebrew, her first name means "mother of pearl". She grew up in the neighbouring city of Ramat HaSharon along with her younger brother. Zuzovsky used to be a Scouts instructor. She graduated high school in 2009, majoring in theatre.

Zuzovsky then volunteered for the pre-army Service Year as a counsellor in a boarding school for at-risk youth. Her parents separated and decided to get divorced during that period. Subsequently, she was enlisted to the Israel Defence Forces as a soldier, where she served as a photographer of Israeli military bands.

Career
She began modelling at the age of 15. As a model, Zuzovsky has appeared in advertising campaigns for Urban Outfitters, Samsung, Sephora and in 2014 appeared in a ten-page spread for Italian Cosmopolitan. In 2016 she became a spokesmodel for Castro, Israel's largest fashion company.

In 2017 Zuzovsky was chosen to appear in a Los Angeles mural by Israeli contemporary artist Tomer Peretz.

Personal life
Zuzovsky started dating Israeli actor and musician Lee Biran in 2014. They separated in 2016. Later that year she briefly dated Israeli musician Asaf Avidan.

Filmography

References

External links 
 

1991 births
Israeli film actresses
Israeli female models
Israeli television actresses
Living people
Actresses from Tel Aviv
Israeli female military personnel
21st-century Israeli actresses
Israeli Ashkenazi Jews
Israeli people of Polish-Jewish descent
Israeli people of Czechoslovak-Jewish descent